Anticomidae is a family of nematodes belonging to the order Enoplida.

Genera:
 Anticoma Bastian, 1865
 Anticomopsis Micoletzky & Kreis, 1930
 Antopus Cobb, 1933
 Cephalanticoma Platonova, 1976
 Odontanticoma Platonova, 1976
 Paranticoma Micoletzky & Kreis, 1930

References

Nematode families